The 2023 Colchester City Council election is due to take place on 4 May 2023 to elect members of Colchester City Council. Seventeen members of the council are due to be elected, one from each of the wards. This set of seats were last up for election in 2019.

The Liberal Democrat–Labour–Green coalition will be defending their majority on the council.

Background

Following the results of the previous election, the Conservative–Independent coalition lost control of the council. On 17 May 2022, it was announced that negotiations between the Liberal Democrats, Labour, and the Green Party would result in a new three-party coalition that would run Colchester Borough Council throughout the 2022-2023 term.

David King (Mile End), a Liberal Democrat, was subsequently elected leader of the council, replacing the defeated Paul Dundas (Stanway) of the Conservatives. A new Cabinet was formed consisting of four Liberal Democrats, three Labour, and one Green Party member.

Timeline

2022

 May 30: Martin Leatherdale (Lexden & Braiswick) leaves the Conservative group to sit as an Independent before resigning several days later, triggering a by-election.

 July 28: A by-election is held in Lexden & Braiswick. Sara Naylor is elected for the Conservatives.

 September 28: Mark Goacher (Castle) leaves the Green group to sit as an Independent.

 October 20: Independent councillors Gerard Oxford (Highwoods) and Beverly Oxford (Highwoods) resign, triggering a double by-election.

 November 24: Colchester is granted City status, with Colchester Borough Council changing its name to Colchester City Council.

 December 8: A double by-election is held in Highwoods. Catherine Bickersteth (Labour) and Alison Jay (Liberal Democrats) are elected.

 December 15: Steph Nissen (Castle), the leader of the Green group on the council, leaves the Green Party and defects to Labour. The same day, former Green and sitting Independent, Mark Goacher (Castle), announced he would rejoin the Green group that he had left several months previously. He subsequently becomes leader of the Green group.

2023

 March 2: Deputy Leader of the Council and Labour group leader, Adam Fox (Old Heath & The Hythe), annouces his intention to resign as Labour group leader and stand down as a councillor when his term expires in May 2023.

 March 8: Chris Pearson (Berechurch) is elected as Labour group leader.

 March 27: Notice of election published.

 April 4: Candidate nominations close at 4pm. Statement of Persons Nominated released.

 April 17: Deadline to register to vote.

 April 18: Deadline to register for a postal vote.

 April 24: Deadline to register for a proxy vote.

 May 4: Date of electon. Polling stations open between 7am and 10pm.

Summary

Election result

Incumbents

Candidates

The Statement of Persons Nominated will detail the candidates standing in each ward. It is generally released shortly after the close of nominations, scheduled for 4 April 2023.

Berechurch

Castle

Greenstead

Highwoods

Lexden & Braiswick

Marks Tey & Layer

Mersea & Pyefleet

Mile End

New Town & Christ Church

Old Heath & The Hythe

Prettygate

Rural North

Shrub End

St. Anne's & St. John's

Stanway

Tiptree

Wivenhoe

References

Notes

Colchester
Colchester Borough Council elections
2020s in Essex